Rampion is a common name for several plants, including:

 Campanula rapunculus, a species of wildflower formerly cultivated as a vegetable
 Physoplexis comosa, tufted horned rampion
 Phyteuma, a genus of wildflowers 
 Valerianella locusta, also known as lamb's lettuce, corn salad, common cornsalad, mâche (/mɑːʃ/), fetticus, feldsalat, nut lettuce, field salad, doucette, and rapunzel (some of these names shared with other rampions).

See also Rapunzel (disambiguation)#Plants.

Energy
 Rampion Wind Farm, a wind farm in the English Channel named after the flower